General (abbreviated GEN) is the second-highest rank, and the highest active rank, of the Australian Army and was created as a direct equivalent of the British military rank of general; it is also considered a four-star rank.

Prior to 1958, Australian generals (and field marshals) were only appointed in exceptional circumstances. In 1958, the position which is currently called Chief of the Defence Force was created, and since 1966, the rank of general has been held when an army officer is appointed to that position.

General is a higher rank than lieutenant general, but is lower than field marshal. General is the equivalent of admiral in the Royal Australian Navy and air chief marshal in the Royal Australian Air Force.

A general's insignia is St Edward's Crown above a star of the Order of the Bath (or 'pip') above a crossed sword and baton, with the word 'Australia' at the bottom.

Australian generals

The following have held the rank of general in the Australian Army:

In addition, Sir John Northcott held the honorary rank of general while acting as Governor-General of Australia in 1951 and 1956. The Australian-born Sir John Hackett also attained the rank of general in the British Army.

See also

Australian Defence Force ranks and insignia
Australian Army officer rank insignia
List of Australian Army generals

Notes

References

Army
 
Australian Army